The 1994 season was the Hawthorn Football Club's 70th season in the Australian Football League and 93rd overall.

Fixture

Premiership season

Finals series

Ladder

References

Hawthorn Football Club seasons